Khalispur is a village in Varanasi tehsil of Varanasi district, Uttar Pradesh, India. The population was 2,892 at the 2011 Indian census. The village is located on the banks of the river Ganges.

Khalispur is served by the Khalispur railway station on the Indian Railways Lucknow Charbagh railway division. Most of the trains though stop at the Ghazipur City railway station which is also the town center.

References

Villages in Varanasi district